The Völkisch movement (alternative ) was a German ethno-nationalist movement active from the late 19th century through to the Nazi era, with remnants in the Federal Republic of Germany afterwards. Erected on the idea of "blood and soil", inspired by the one-body-metaphor (Volkskörper, "ethnic body"; literally "body of the people"), and by the idea of naturally grown communities in unity, it was characterized by organicism, racialism, populism, agrarianism, romantic nationalism and – as a consequence of a growing exclusive and ethnic connotation – by antisemitism from the 1900s onward. Völkisch nationalists generally considered the Jews to be an "alien people" who belonged to a different Volk ("race" or "folk") from the Germans.

The Völkisch movement was not a homogeneous set of beliefs, but rather a "variegated sub-culture" that rose in opposition to the socio-cultural changes of modernity. The "only denominator common" to all Völkisch theorists was the idea of a national rebirth, inspired by the traditions of the Ancient Germans which had been "reconstructed" on a romantic basis by the adherents of the movement.  This rebirth would have been achieved by either "Germanizing" Christianity – an Abrahamic and "Semitic" religion that spread into Europe from the Near East – or by rejecting any Christian heritage that existed in Germany in order to revive pre-Christian Germanic paganism. In a narrow definition, the term is used to designate only groups that consider human beings essentially preformed by blood, or by inherited characteristics.

The Völkischen are often encompassed in a wider Conservative Revolution by scholars, a German national conservative movement that rose in prominence during the Weimar Republic (1918–1933).

During the period of the Third Reich, Adolf Hitler and the Nazis believed in and enforced a definition of the German Volk which excluded Jews, the Romani people, Jehovah's Witnesses, homosexuals, and other "foreign elements" living in Germany.  Their policies led to these "undesirables" being rounded up and murdered in large numbers, in what became known as The Holocaust.

Translation 
The adjective Völkisch is derived from the German word Volk (cognate with the English "folk"), which has overtones of "nation", "race" or "tribe". While Völkisch has no direct English equivalent, it could be loosely translated as "ethno-nationalist", "ethnic-chauvinist", "ethnic-popular", or, closer to its original meaning, as "bio-mystical racialist".

If Völkisch writers used terms like Nordische Rasse ("Nordic race") and Germanentum ("Germanic peoples"), their concept of Volk could, however, also be more flexible, and understood as a Gemeinsame Sprache ("common language"), or as an Ausdruck einer Landschaftsseele ("expression of a landscape's soul"), in the words of geographer Ewald Banse.

The defining idea which the Völkisch movement revolved around was that of a Volkstum, literally the "folkdom" or the "culture of the Volk". Other associated German words include Volksboden (the "Volk's essential substrate"), Volksgeist (the "spirit of the Volk"), Volksgemeinschaft (the "community of the Volk"), as well as Volkstümlich ("folksy" or "traditional") and Volkstümlichkeit (the "popular celebration of the Volkstum").

Definition 
The Völkisch movement was not unified but rather "a cauldron of beliefs, fears and hopes that found expression in various movements and were often articulated in an emotional tone". According to historian Nicholas Goodrick-Clarke, Völkisch denoted the "national collectivity inspired by a common creative energy, feelings and sense of individuality. These metaphysical qualities were supposed to define the unique cultural essence of the German people." Journalist Peter Ross Range writes that "Völkisch is very hard to define and almost untranslatable into English. The word has been rendered as popular, populist, people's, racial, racist, ethnic-chauvinist, nationalistic, communitarian (for Germans only), conservative, traditional, Nordic, romantic – and it means, in fact, all of those. The völkisch political ideology ranged from a sense of German superiority to a spiritual resistance to 'the evils of industrialization and the atomization of modern man,' wrote scholar David Jablonsky. But its central component, as Harold J. Gordon, Jr., noted, was always racism".

Völkisch thinkers tended to idealize the myth of an "original nation", that still could be found at that time in the rural regions of Germany, a form of "primitive democracy freely subjected to their natural elites." The notion of "people" (Volk) subsequently turned into the idea of a "racial essence", and Völkisch thinkers referred to the term as a birth-giving and quasi-eternal entity—in the same way as they would write on "the Nature"—rather than a sociological category.

The movement combined sentimental patriotic interest in German folklore, local history and a "back-to-the-land" anti-urban populism with many parallels in the writings of William Morris. "In part this ideology was a revolt against modernity", Nicholls remarked. As they sought to overcome what they felt was the malaise of a scientistic and rationalistic modernity, Völkisch authors imagined a spiritual solution in a Volks essence perceived as authentic, intuitive, even "primitive", in the sense of an alignment with a primordial and cosmic order.

History

Origins in the 19th century 
The Völkisch movement emerged in the late 19th century, drawing inspiration from German Romanticism and the history of the Holy Roman Empire, and what many saw as its harmonious hierarchical order. The delayed unification of the German-speaking peoples under a single German Reich in the 19th century is cited as conducive to the emergence of the Völkisch movement.

Despite the previous lower-class connotation associated to the word Volk, the Völkisch movement saw the term with a noble overtone suggesting a German ascendancy over other peoples. Thinkers led by Arthur de Gobineau (1816–1882), Georges Vacher de Lapouge (1854–1936), Houston Stewart Chamberlain (1855–1927), Ludwig Woltmann (1871–1907) and Alexis Carrel (1873–1944) were inspired by Charles Darwin's theory of evolution in advocating a "race struggle" and a hygienist vision of the world. They had conceptualized a racialist and hierarchical definition of the peoples of the world where Aryans (or Germans) had to be at the summit of the white race. The purity of the bio-mystical and primordial nation theorized by the Völkisch thinkers then began to be seen as having been corrupted by foreign elements, Jewish in particular.

Before World War I 
The same word Volk was used as a flag for new forms of ethnic nationalism, as well as by international socialist parties as a synonym for the proletariat in the German lands. From the left, elements of the folk-culture spread to the parties of the middle classes.

Although the primary interest of the Germanic mystical movement was the revival of native pagan traditions and customs (often set in the context of a quasi-theosophical esotericism), a marked preoccupation with purity of race came to motivate its more politically oriented offshoots, such as the Germanenorden (the Germanic or Teutonic Order), a secret society founded at Berlin in 1912 which required its candidates to prove that they had no "non-Aryan" bloodlines and required from each a promise to maintain purity of his stock in marriage. Local groups of the sect met to celebrate the summer solstice, an important neopagan festivity in völkisch circles (and later in Nazi Germany), and more regularly to read the Eddas as well as some of the German mystics.

Not all folkloric societies with connections to Romantic nationalism were located in Germany. The Völkisch movement was a force as well in Austria. Meanwhile, the community of Monte Verità ('Mount Truth') which emerged in 1900 at Ascona, Switzerland is described by the Swiss art critic Harald Szeemann as "the southernmost outpost of a far-reaching Nordic lifestyle-reform, that is, alternative movement".

Weimar Republic 
The political agitation and uncertainty that followed World War I nourished a fertile background for the renewed success of various Völkish sects that were abundant in Berlin at the time, but if the Völkisch movement became significant by the number of groups during the Weimar Republic, they were not so by the number of adherents. A few Völkische authors tried to revive what they believed to be a true German faith (Deutschglaube), by resurrecting the cult of the ancient Germanic gods. Various occult movements such as ariosophy were connected to Völkisch theories, and artistic circles were largely present among the Völkischen, like the painters Ludwig Fahrenkrog (1867–1952) and Fidus (1868–1948). By May 1924, essayist Wilhelm Stapel perceived the movement as capable of embracing and reconciling the whole nation: in his view, Völkisch had an idea to spread instead of a party programme and were led by heroes — not by "calculating politicians". Scholar Petteri Pietikäinen also observed Völkisch influences on Carl Gustav Jung.

Influence on Nazism 
The völkisch ideologies were influential in the development of Nazism. Indeed, Joseph Goebbels publicly asserted in the 1927 Nuremberg rally that if the populist (völkisch) movement had understood power and how to bring thousands out in the streets, it would have gained political power on 9 November 1918 (the outbreak of the SPD-led German Revolution of 1918–1919, end of the German monarchy). Nazi racial understanding was couched in völkisch terms, as when Eugen Fischer delivered his inaugural address as Nazi rector, The Conception of the Völkisch state in the view of biology (29 July 1933). Karl Harrer, the Thule Society member most directly involved in the creation of the DAP in 1919, was sidelined at the end of the year when Hitler drafted regulations against conspiratorial circles, and the Thule Society was dissolved a few years later. The völkisch circles handed down one significant legacy to the Nazis: In 1919, Thule Society member Friedrich Krohn designed the original version of the Nazi swastika.

In January 1919, the Thule Society was instrumental in the foundation of the German Workers' Party (DAP), which later became the National Socialist German Workers' Party (NSDAP), commonly called the Nazi Party. Thule Society members or visiting guests of the Thule Society who would later join the Nazi Party included Rudolf Hess, Alfred Rosenberg, Hans Frank, Gottfried Feder, Dietrich Eckart and Karl Harrer. Notably, Adolf Hitler was never a member of the Thule Society and Rudolf Hess and Alfred Rosenberg were only visiting guests of the Thule Society in the early years before they came to prominence in the Nazi movement. After being appointed Chairman of the NSDAP in 1921, Hitler moved to sever the party's link with the Thule Society, expelling Harrer in the process; the Society subsequently fell into decline and was dissolved in 1925.

Modern usage in Heathenry 

In Heathenry, the terms "Völkisch,” "neo-völkisch,” or the anglicisation "folkish,” are used both as endonyms and exonyms for groups that believe that the religion is intimately connected to a perceived biological race, which they often describe as "Northern European,” or more specific groupings such as "English.” These classifications are typically held to be self-evident by folkish Heathens, despite the academic consensus that race is a cultural construct. Folkish groups often use ethnonationalist language and maintain that only members of these racial groupings can legitimately adhere to the religion, holding the pseudoscientific view that "gods and goddesses are encoded in the DNA of the descendants of the ancients."

In online media, folkish Heathens often express a belief in a threat from racial mixing, which is often blamed on the socio-political establishment, sometimes arguing their racial exclusivity is a result of the threat other ethnic groups pose to white people or due to explicit white supremacist ideologies.  It has been noted that while the groups typically state an aim to revive Germanic paganism, their views regarding the centrality of race have origins instead in 19th-century thinking. The Odinic Rite states that while prevention of ethnic mixing was not a stance taken by heathens prior to Christianisation, it is needed now to maintain "racial integrity" and prevent "crossed allegiances.” The Odinic Rite and the Odinist Fellowship profess an apolitical stance, although academic Ethan Doyle White characterises their ideologies as the “extreme right.”

As of 2021, 32 neo-völkisch organizations in the United States are designated as hate groups by the Southern Poverty Law Center, with the largest being the Asatru Folk Assembly.

Active groups that are identified by scholars, institutions, or themselves openly include:
 Artgemeinschaft (Germany)
 Asatru Folk Assembly (United States)
 Odinia International (United States)
 Odinic Rite (United Kingdom, United States, Canada)
 Odinist Fellowship (United Kingdom)
 Vigrid (Norway)
 Woden's Folk (United Kingdom)
 Wolves of Vinland (United States)
 Wotansvolk (United States)

Inactive groups that are identified by scholars, institutions, or themselves openly include:
 Heathen Front (Norway)
 National Socialist Kindred (United States)
 Odinist Fellowship (United States)

See also 

 Ariosophy
 Aryanism
 Aryan race
 Blood and soil
 Der Wehrwolf
 Ethnic groups in Europe
 German nationalism
 Guido von List
 Jörg Lanz von Liebenfels
 Hungarian nationalism
 Ideology of the Committee of Union and Progress
 Kemalism (1934 Turkish Resettlement Law)
 Master race
 Mathilde Ludendorff
 Nazism and occultism
 Neo-Nazism
 Neo-völkisch movements
 Nordic race
 Pan-German League (Alldeutscher Verband)
 Pan-Germanism
 Pan-Turkism
 Turanism
 Hungarian Turanism
 Racial theory
 Religion in Nazi Germany
 Religious aspects of Nazism
 Religious views of Adolf Hitler
 Rodnovery
 Sociology of immigration
 Thule Society
 Volksdeutsche
 Volkshalle

References 
Notes

 Bibliography 

 

Mosse, George L. (1964). The Crisis of German Ideology: Intellectual Origins Of The Third Reich. New York: Grosset & Dunlap.

External links 
 John Rosenthal (22 April 2005) "The Ummah and das Volk: on the Islamist and "Völkisch" Ideologies". Transatlantic Intelligencer

Early Nazism (–1933)
Collectivism
Far-right politics in Germany
Fascist movements
German nationalism
Nationalism in Germany
Political movements in Germany
Religious nationalism
Social movements in Germany
White supremacy